Gyzylsuw, is a small town in the Balkan region of Turkmenistan.  It is known for shipwrecks near its beaches. There is a train station called the Gyzyl-Suv Train Station which is close to the shipwrecks.  The tourist destination, Awaza is nearby the town.

References 

Populated places in Balkan Region